The 1966 Arkansas Razorbacks football team represented the University of Arkansas in the Southwest Conference (SWC) during the 1966 NCAA University Division football season. In their ninth year under head coach Frank Broyles, the Razorbacks compiled an 8–2 record (5–2 against SWC opponents), finished in a tie for second place in the SWC, and outscored all opponents by a combined total of 218 to 73.

Arkansas defensive tackle Loyd Phillips and defensive back Martine Bercher were selected as first-team players on the 1965 College Football All-America Team. Phillips finished ninth in the Heisman Trophy voting and won the Outland Trophy, awarded to the best interior lineman in the land.  Bercher gained an average of 15.5 yards per punt return, the fifth-best mark in the nation. The Arkansas defense gave up the seventh-lowest point total per game, 7.3.

Shocking losses to Baylor and Texas Tech prevented Arkansas from its third consecutive berth in the Cotton Bowl Classic. The Razorbacks' 21-16 loss to the Red Raiders at Lubbock in the season finale handed the Cotton Bowl berth to SMU, which Arkansas defeated 22-0 in Fayetteville the week before blowing it vs. Tech.

Schedule

Game summaries

Texas

    
    
    
    

Arkansas' third consecutive victory over Texas.

References

Arkansas
Arkansas Razorbacks football seasons
Arkansas Razorbacks football